Vaughton is a surname. Notable people with the surname include:

Howard Vaughton (1861–1937), English footballer
Jonny Vaughton (born 1982), Welsh rugby union player
Roland Vaughton (1914–1979), Australian cricketer
Willis Vaughton (1911–2007), English footballer

See also
Aughton (disambiguation)